is the FNN/FNS station for Nagasaki. The station's call sign is JOWH-DTV.

History
1968 - KTN is founded.
April 1, 1969 - KTN begins broadcasting. The station was a dual affiliate of FNN and NNN.
July 14, 1986 - The analog master station was improved.
October 1, 1990 - The station becomes a sole FNN/FNS affiliate. NNN/NNS programming moved to the newly launched NIB.
December 1, 2006 - Digital terrestrial broadcasts commence.
July 24, 2011 - Analog transmissions conclude.

References

External links
 Official website 

Television stations in Japan
Television channels and stations established in 1969